Dural is a suburb of Sydney, New South Wales, Australia.

Dural may also refer to:
Duralumin or dural, an age-hardenable aluminium alloy
 Pertaining to dura mater
Dural (Virtua Fighter), a character in Virtua Fighter
Dural (surname)

See also

Dura (disambiguation)